The 40th Ariel Awards ceremony, organized by the Mexican Academy of Film Arts and Sciences (AMACC) took place on December 14, 1998, in Mexico City. During the ceremony, AMACC presented the Ariel Award in 23 categories honoring films released in 1997. Por Si No Te Vuelvo a Ver received eight awards out of 19 nominations, including Best Picture and Best Director for Juan Pablo Villaseñor. De Noche Vienes, Esmeralda followed with five accolades; Libre de Culpas with three, and ¿Quién Diablos es Juliette? and Katuwira: Donde Nacen y Mueren los Sueños with two.

Awards
Winners are listed first and highlighted with boldface

Multiple nominations and awards

The following seven films received multiple nominations:

Films that received multiple awards:

References

Ariel Awards ceremonies
1998 film awards
1998 in Mexico